James Blake was the defending champion but decided not to participate. 
John-Patrick Smith won the title, defeating Ričardas Berankis 3–6, 6–3, 7–6(7–3) in the final.

Seeds

Draw

Finals

Top half

Bottom half

References
 Main Draw
 Qualifying Draw

Nielsen Pro Tennis Championship - Singles
2012 Singles